The ESP SV is a series of electric guitars produced by ESP.

The ESP SV is a series that is only produced for the Japanese and European market. Notable users of models in the SV Series include Alexi Laiho of Children of Bodom, Kai Hansen of Gamma Ray, Mike Spreitzer of DevilDriver, and Circuit.V.Panther formerly of Sex Machineguns. The ESP SV design is similar to that of the Jackson Randy Rhoads; distinguishing features are the tummy cut on the rear of the guitar and hand cutout where the neck joins the body (the SV is also larger than the Randy Rhoads).

Products in the series include:
ESP SV Standard
ESP SV-I Standard NT
ESP SV-II Standard
ESP SV-285
ESP SV-320

ESP SV Standard
The ESP SV Standard neck-thru body construction in a 25.5" scale. The fingerboard features dot inlays with the model name at the 12th fret. It has 24 extra jumbo frets. It comes in black with white pin stripe and white with black pinstripe. It has one volume and a 3-way toggle switch.

Other Specs
Body Wood: Alder
Neck Wood: Maple
Fingerboard Wood: Ebony with white binding
Pickups: EMG 81 (Bridge)/EMG 81 (Neck)
Bridge: Floyd Rose Original

ESP SV-I Standard NT
The ESP SV-I Standard NT neck-thru body construction in a 25.5" scale. The fingerboard features dot inlays with the model name at the 12th fret. It has 24 extra jumbo frets. It comes in black. It has one volume.

Other Specs
Body Wood: Alder
Neck Wood: Maple
Fingerboard Wood: Ebony
Pickups: EMG 81 (Bridge)
Bridge: Tune-o-Matic with String-thru-body

ESP SV-285
The ESP SV-285 neck-thru body construction in a 25.5" scale. The fingerboard features dot inlays. It has 24 extra jumbo frets. It comes in black. It has one volume and a 3-way toggle switch.

Other Specs
Body Wood: Alder
Neck Wood: 3-piece Maple
Fingerboard Wood: Ebony with white binding
Pickups: Seymour Duncan SH-1n (Neck)/Seymour Duncan SH-4 (Bridge)
Bridge: Tune-o-Matic String-thru-body

ESP SV-320
The ESP SV-285 neck-thru body construction in a 25.5" scale. The fingerboard features dot inlays. It has 24 extra jumbo frets. It comes in black. It has one volume and a 3-way toggle switch.

Other Specs
Body Wood: Alder
Neck Wood: 3-piece Maple
Fingerboard Wood: Ebony with white binding
Pickups: Seymour Duncan SH-1n (Neck)/Seymour Duncan SH-4 (Bridge)
Bridge: Floyd Rose Original

See also
ESP Guitars
ESP Alexi Laiho

SV